Janne Ferm (born 29 August 1980) is a Finnish rally co-driver. He is currently teamed with Esapekka Lappi and is competing for Toyota Gazoo Racing WRT in the World Rally Championship.

Rally career
Janne Ferm began his rally career in 2007, co-driving for several drivers. In 2010, he firmed the partnership with Esapekka Lappi. In the 2011 Rally Finland, he made his WRC debut, where the crew drove in a Citroën C2 R2 Max.

In 2013, the Finnish crew was signed by Škoda Motorsport and competed selected events in WRC-2 in a Škoda Fabia S2000.

In 2016, the crew won the WRC-2 championship with the Škoda Fabia R5 after winning in Finland, Germany, Wales and Australia.

Lappi and Ferm were signed by Toyota Gazoo Racing to drive a Toyota Yaris WRC in the 2017 World Rally Championship. On their second event with the team, the 2017 Rally Italia Sardegna, the crew won their first ever stage in the WRC, along with five more stage wins. They eventually finished fourth overall. In just their fourth World Rally Car start, at their home event of 2017 Rally Finland, the crew took their first WRC victory.

In October 2018, Toyota announced that both Lappi and Ferm would leave the team at the end of the 2018 championship. They joined Citroën for the 2019 season, partnering with multiple champion Sébastien Ogier.

Victories

WRC victories

Career results

WRC results
 
* Season still in progress.

SWRC results

WRC-2 results

ERC results

APRC results

References

External links

 Janne Ferm's e-wrc profile

1980 births
Living people
Finnish rally co-drivers
World Rally Championship co-drivers